Christine J. Harrison is a Professor of Childhood Cancer Cytogenetics at Newcastle University. She works on acute leukemia and used cytogenetics to optimise treatment protocols.

Early life and education 
Harrison attended an all girls school, where she was encouraged to become a nurse or a teacher. Harrison went to work at GlaxoSmithKline, before returning to education and securing her A-Levels. She was appointed as a research technician at the Paterson Institute for Cancer Research. She was encouraged to attend university, and studied zoology at the University of Manchester. She remained there for her postgraduate studies, and earned a PhD in cell biology in 1978. During her postgraduate degree Harrison became interested in cytogenetics.

Research and career 
In the 1980s Harrison established the Oncology Cytogenetics Service at the Christie Hospital in Manchester. She subsequently held posts at the Royal Free Hospital and University of Southampton. In 2001 Harrison was awarded a £1.7 million grant to investigate the genetic causes of childhood leukaemia. She identified that possession of the Philadelphia chromosome can make it more likely that children will be diagnosed with leukaemia. She has continued to search for new measures of prognosis, and found that the level of minimal residual disease can be a reliable predictor of outcome. Her research has contributed to the increased survival rate (up to 90 %) of children with acute lymphoblastic leukaemia.

Harrison works with scientists around the world to identify the genetic causes of leukaemia and treatment resistance. She has gone beyond whole genome sequencing to study the 5 – 10 % of the genome which is unchartered. Harrison has made several discoveries of abnormal genes, that can help in diagnosis and help doctors personalise healthcare. She collects data from acute leukaemia clinical trials, studying . She identified that a chromosome abnormality known as rob(15;21)c increases people's likelihood to develop leukaemia. For patients with this Robertsonian translocation, leukaemia is initiated by chromothripsis; an event which breaks two chromosomes and reconfigures them in an flawed manner. Harrison is investigating new treatments to target leukemia cells.

Since 2008 Harrison has served as a Professor of Cytogenetics at Newcastle University.  Harrison serves on the research funding committee of Bloodwise.

Awards and honours 
Her awards and honours include;

 2013 Elected to the Academy of Medical Sciences

Selected publications

References 

Academics of Newcastle University
Year of birth missing (living people)
Living people